is a railway station on the Chikuho Main Line operated by JR Kyushu in Kurate, Kurate District, Fukuoka Prefecture, Japan.

Lines

Station layout 
The station consists of two side platforms serving two tracks. The platforms are not opposed. The tracks run on the east side of each platform. A station building of modern concrete design houses a waiting room and automatic ticket vending machines. Access to the opposite side platform is by means of a sheltered footbridge.

Adjacent stations

History 
The station was opened by JR Kyushu on 1 July 1987 as an additional station on the existing Chikuhō Main Line track.

On 4 March 2017, Kurate, along with several other stations on the line, became a remotely managed "Smart Support Station".

Passenger statistics
In fiscal 2016, the station was used by an average of 740 passengers daily (boarding passengers only), and it ranked 197th among the busiest stations of JR Kyushu.

References

External links
Kurate Station (JR Kyushu)

Railway stations in Fukuoka Prefecture
Railway stations in Japan opened in 1987